Sister-books is the term for a group of texts in the medieval literature. These works were written by Dominican nuns in the first half of the fourteenth century in South Germany and Switzerland. They relate the mystical experiences of sisters within the monastery, and were influential in the development of medieval mysticism.

Content

Some of the sister-books begin with brief, mostly legendary, outlines of the founding history of the monastery, but less attention is paid to the historical facts than to the sentiments and heroic actions of founders. The central content of the books consists of reports on the lives of deceased members of the convent. The sister-books depict not only convent sisters, but also lay nuns and sometimes also men associated with the convent. The presentation usually concentrates on those events in which the subject has acted in an exemplary manner, especially through visions or mystical experiences. Occasionally, the reverse is also shown, when a person's failure or the loss of graces is reported. Essential aspects of the monastic as well as the individual religious life come up, along with current theological problems from questions of monastic obedience to the doctrine of grace and the Trinity dogma. Other themes include co-suffering with Christ and the question of the soul.

Literary form

The sister-books are a type of medieval lives literature, in which each work relates the lives of a number of people. These descriptions focus on the person's relationship to God and their behavior in the monastic community. This genre of writing was similar to the Vitae Fratrum of male Dominican orders, which in turn was heavily influenced by the Vitae Patrum, a collection of sayings from early Christian monks. The sister-books are also characterized by both the forms and structures of legendary narrative and the vocabulary and motifs of mysticism; the texts take images and metaphors quite seriously. In addition, note that all but one of the sister-books were written in the German vernacular, while the Unterlinden sister-book was written in Latin. None of the original manuscripts of the sister-books survive to this day; scholars rely on later copies, some of which were done as early as the fifteenth century.

Significance

While the sister-books were often devalued in older scholarship as products of naive nuns and as an expression of a flattened mysticism, today they find new attention as authentic testimonies of a women's monastic writing culture. Since only men were permitted to write theological treatises, highly educated women turned to narrative forms, especially in the form of vision narratives, to explain or discuss concepts of religious thought and action.

At the same time, these books are important documents for the history of German mysticism. They show that mysticism in women's monasteries was not just a consequence of Dominican preaching; rather, it preceded it in some monasteries. In the discourse on women's religious experiences, Meister Eckhart, Johannes Tauler, Heinrich Seuse and others developed their mystical theology and pastoral care.

Works

References
Footnotes

Sources
 Béatrice W. Acklin-Zimmermann: Gott im Denken berühren. Die theologischen Implikationen der Nonnenviten (= Dokimion 14). Freiburg (Schweiz) 1993.
 Walter Blank: Die Nonnenviten des 14. Jahrhunderts. Eine Studie zur hagiographischen Literatur des Mittelalters unter besonderer Berücksichtigung der Visionen und Lichtphänomene. Diss. Freiburg i. Br. 1962
 Patricia Dailey: "Promised Bodies: Time, Language, and Corporeality in Medieval Women's Mystical Texts New York, 2013
 Peter Dronke: Women Writers of the Middle Ages New York 1984
 Hester McNeal Reed Gehring: The Language of Mysticism in South German Dominican Convent Chronicles of the XIVth Century. Phil. Diss. Michigan 1957
 Jeffrey Hamburger: Crown and Veil: Female Monasticism from the fifth to the fifteenth centuries New York, 2008
 Georg Kunze: Studien zu den Nonnenviten des deutschen Mittelalters. Ein Beitrag zur religiösen Literatur im Mittelalter. Diss. (masch.) Hamburg 1953
 Otto Langer: Mystische Erfahrung und spirituelle Theologie. Zu Meister Eckharts Auseinandersetzung mit der Frauenfrömmigkeit seiner Zeit (= Münchener Texte und Untersuchungen zur deutschen Literatur des Mittelalters 91). Artemis, München/Zürich 1987 (Inhaltsverzeichnis).
 Gertrud Jaron Lewis: Bibliographie zur deutschen Frauenmystik des Mittelalters. Mit einem Anhang zu Beatrijs van Nazareth und Hadewijch von Frank Willaert und Marie-Jose Govers (= Bibliographien zur deutschen Literatur des Mittelalters, Heft 10). E. Schmidt, Berlin 1989.
 Gertrud Lewis: By Women, for Women, about Women: The Sister-Books of Fourteenth-Century Germany Toronto 1996
 Ruth Meyer: Das St. Katharinentaler Schwesternbuch. Untersuchung, Edition, Kommentar (= Münchener Texte zur deutschen Literatur des Mittelalters, Band 104). Niemeyer, Tübingen 1995, zugleich Dissertation Universität München, 1994 (Edition der Handschrift Kantonsbibliothek Thurgau, Y 74).
 Heinrich Seuse: Zwei Briefe. * Elsbeth Stagel: Sophia von Klingnau. Aus dem Buch vom Leben der Schwestern zu Töss. * Arnold der Rote: Von der Geburt des Herrn. Predigtfragment. (14. Jh.) online über ihn. * Barthlome Fridöwer: Predigt über die Zehn Staffeln der göttlichen Liebe. * Bruder Klaus: Drei Visionen. * Unbekannt: Von einer Heidin. Aus einer Zürcher Handschrift vom Jahr 1393.</ref> Sammlung Klosterberg, Schweizerische Reihe. Verlag Benno Schwabe, Basel 1943; wieder Diogenes, Basel 1986,  (UT: Ausgewählte Proben der schweizerischen Mystik).
 Ursula Peters: Religiöse Erfahrung als literarisches Faktum. Zur Vorgeschichte und Genese frauenmystischer Texte des 13. und 14. Jahrhunderts (= Hermaea NF 56). Niemeyer, Tübingen 1988.
 Siegfried Ringler: Viten- und Offenbarungsliteratur in Frauenklöstern des Mittelalters. Quellen und Studien (= Münchener Texte und Untersuchungen zur deutschen Literatur des Mittelalters 72). Artemis, München 1980, S. 7–15; 257–259; 358f. u. ö. (s. Register:  Nonnenviten) Rezension online
 Wolfram Schneider-Lastin: Literaturproduktion und Bibliothek in Oetenbach. – In: Bettelorden, Bruderschaften und Beginen in Zürich: Stadtkultur und Seelenheil im Mittelalter'', hrsg. von Barbara Helbling u. a. – Verlag Neue Zürcher Zeitung, Zürich 2002, S. 188–197. –  (bes. über das Oetenbacher Schwesternbuch)

Medieval literature
Christian mystical texts
Nunneries